Abgarm (also Romanized as Ābgarm; also known as Ribāt-i-Shāh ‘Abbāsi and Robāţ-e Shāh ‘Abbāsī) is a village in Pasakuh Rural District, Zavin District, Kalat County, Razavi Khorasan Province, Iran. At the 2006 census, its population was 827, in 192 families.

See also 

 List of cities, towns and villages in Razavi Khorasan Province

References 

Populated places in Kalat County